Embrya is the second studio album by American recording artist Maxwell, released on June 30, 1998, by Columbia Records. As on his 1996 debut album Maxwell's Urban Hang Suite, he collaborated with record producer and Sade collaborator Stuart Matthewman. A neo soul album, Embrya features heavy basslines, string arrangements, and an emphasis on groove over melodies. It has themes of love and spirituality.

Background 
With a lesser jazz emphasis than his debut album, Embrya continues the trend towards heavy basslines and string arrangements, and it focuses on themes such as love and spirituality. However, the album features more of an emphasis on groove than melodies. Its production sound contains bassy, electronic and slight syncopated beats. Maxwell has defined the album's title as "an approaching growing transition thought to be contained but destined for broader perception."

Critical reception 

Embrya was originally received unfavorably by most critics. In the Chicago Tribune, Greg Kot wrote that the record "functions primarily as background music, sustaining its contemplative tone and percolating groove almost too well". Ann Powers of The New York Times called Maxwell "an expert seducer" and the music "the aural equivalent of lotion rubbed on one's back by someone interesting", but believed the lyrics lacked substance. Greg Tate wrote in Spin that the album "comes off as a tad New Agey, art-rock pretentious, emotionally calculated, and sappy." Dream Hampton, writing in The Village Voice, said that the "listless and unfocused" songwriting does not redeem the "ridiculous, loaded song titles" and found the music "lazy": "The band drones along as if in some somnambulant session that never ends." In The Village Voice, Robert Christgau cited "Luxure: Cococure" as a "choice cut", indicating "a good song on an album that isn't worth your time or money".  Stephen Thomas Erlewine deemed Embrya "a bit of a sophomore stumble, albeit one with promising moments", while writing in AllMusic, "[Maxwell] overstuffs his songs with ideas that lead nowhere". In The Rolling Stone Album Guide (2004), Arion Berger found the songs monotonous and called the album "unfocused and pretentious ... full of overwrought, underwritten songs with obscure, fancy titles revolving around a sort of sexual gnosticism."

In a positive review, Connie Johnson from the Los Angeles Times viewed Maxwell's music as unique and the album as an improvement from his debut album, which was "somewhat derivative". Rob Sheffield of Rolling Stone magazine complimented its lush musical backdrops and found the songs "pretty wonderful, even though they're impossible to tell apart or to remember after they're done." David Browne, writing in Entertainment Weekly, called the album "beautiful R&B background music" and felt that, despite vague and pretentious lyrics, it serves as "the culmination of the retro-soul movement that began taking shape several years ago." Amy Linden of Vibe called it "neo-soul via ambience" and said that "like smoke, Maxwell's love songs drift away, fading ever so seductively into the background, where they stay." Critics have since reappraised Embrya as a groundbreaking forerunner to later trends in Alternative R&B, and Columbia Records reissued the album in 2018 on its 20th Anniversary.  Embrya was nominated for a Grammy Award for Best R&B Album, losing to Lauryn Hill's The Miseducation of Lauryn Hill (1998). In 1999, it won the Soul Train Music Award for Best Male Soul/R&B Album.

Commercial performance 
Embrya was released on June 10, 1998. It sold more than one million copies and garnered Maxwell a new alternative fanbase, but confounded urban consumers. On May 26, 1999, the album was certified platinum by the Recording Industry Association of America (RIAA).

Track listing

Notes:
"Gestation: Mythos" on initial CD pressings is a pregap track, later pressings include it as track 1, thus pushing the other track numbers forward by one. A 2019 remaster approved by Maxwell places the track at the end of the album.

Personnel 
Credits are adapted from Allmusic.

 Gloria Agostini – harp 
 Chris Apostle – production coordination 
 Carl Carter – bass 
 Tom Coyne – mastering 
 Clark Gayton – trombone 
 Kerry Griffin – drums 
 Lisa Guastella – production coordination assistant 
 Russell Gunn – trumpet 
 Reggie Hamilton – bass, nylon-string guitar 
 Bashiri Johnson – percussion 
 Gene Lake – drums 
 Glen Marchese – engineer, mixing 
 Stuart Matthewman – beats, guitar, mixing, producer, programming, baritone saxophone
 Maxwell – beats, engineer, horn arrangements, mixing, producer, vocals
 Greg Moore – guitar 
 Mike Pela – associate producer, mixing 
 Julian Peploe – art direction 
 Susan Poliacik – cello 
 Matthew Raimondi – violin 
 Andrew Richardson – stylist 
 Daniel Sadownick – percussion 
 Veronica Salas – viola 
 Darrell Smith – beats, engineer, producer 
 Mario Sorrenti – phjo 
 Gerald Tarack – violin

Charts

Weekly charts

Year-end charts

Certifications

References

Bibliography

External links
 

1998 albums
Maxwell (musician) albums
Columbia Records albums